The 2001 IAAF Golden League was the fourth edition of the annual international track and field meeting series, held from 29 June to 31 August. It was contested at seven European meetings: the Golden Gala, Meeting Gaz de France, Bislett Games, Herculis, Weltklasse Zürich, Memorial Van Damme and the Internationales Stadionfest (ISTAF).

The Golden League jackpot consisted of one million US dollars' worth of gold bars. The jackpot was available to athletes who won at least five of the seven competitions of the series in one of the fourteen specified events (8 for men, 6 for women). The jackpot events for 2001 were:
Men: 100 m, 800 m, 1500 m, 3000 m, 3000 m steeplechase, 110 m hurdles, long jump, javelin throw 
Women: 100 m, 800 m, 1500 m, 3000 m, 400 m hurdles, high jump 

The jackpot winners were Hicham El Guerrouj of Morocco, Switzerland's André Bucher, Americans Allen Johnson and Marion Jones, Romania's Violeta Szekely and Olga Yegorova of Russia. Szekely won all seven of the 1,500-metre races, while the other athletes won the minimum of five. Marion Jones's results were later annulled after she admitted to doping.

Results

References

Results
Oslo
Paris
Rome
Monaco
Zurich
Brussels
Berlin

External links
IAAF competition website

Golden League
IAAF Golden League